The Kennedy Awards, also known as the NRMA Kennedy Awards, are Australian awards for journalism based in Sydney, New South Wales, run by the Kennedy Foundation, and named in honour of  Indigenous Australian journalist Les Kennedy, who died in 2011.  there are 34 categories in the annual event, with the main prize being The Kennedy Prize – Journalist of the Year, while a Lifetime Achievement Award is awarded each year as well.

History
Commencing in 2012, named  in honour of Indigenous journalist Les Kennedy (1958–2011) in the year after his death, the intention was to stage an event in NSW equivalent to journalism awards in other states and territories. However the Kennedy Awards quickly grew to being a national event. The Kennedy Foundation was created as a charitable organisation on 7 March 2014 in order to attract funds for the awards and other endeavours, including providing scholarships for young Aboriginal and Torres Strait Islander journalists.

The awards have been run annually without interruption since 2012. In 2021 they were also referred to as the NRMA Kennedy Awards, being sponsored by the NRMA. There were 34 categories in 2022.

In 2021–2022 the Kennedy Foundation entered a sponsorship deal with an organisation calling itself the Australian Journalists Association, which was exposed as a front for an organisation of dubious integrity, the Journalists First Inc., a small group of conservative political operatives based in Queensland which spread anti-vaccination and other controversial information. The foundation ceased its association with this organisation in May 2022.

Kennedy Foundation

The foundation is a strong advocate for cultural and gender diversity in media.  the foundation is chaired by accountant Carl Dumbrell; in 2021 the chair was Rocco Fazzari.

Awards

The awards take place in Sydney. The main prize is Journalist of the Year (won by women in seven out of the nine events after 2012). Five of its awards are named after outstanding journalists, in several categories: Sport (Peter Frilingos); Indigenous Affairs (John Newfong); Outstanding Columnist (Peter Ruehl); Les Kennedy (Outstanding Crime Reporting) and Outstanding Foreign Correspondent (Tom Krause).

Past winners
The Kennedy Prize – Journalist of the Year
2012: Kate McClymont, The Sydney Morning Herald
2013: Joanne McCarthy, Newcastle Herald
2014: Adele Ferguson, Fairfax Media, ABC TV
2015: Caro Meldrum-Hanna, Four Corners, ABC TV
2016: Adele Ferguson
2017: Chris O'Keefe, Nine News
2018: Sharri Markson, The Daily Telegraph
2019: Anne Connolly, Four Corners, 7:30, ABC TV
2020: Nick McKenzie, of 60 Minutes, The Age, The Sydney Morning Herald
2021: Samantha Maiden, of news.com.au
2022: Nick McKenzie

Lifetime Achievement Award
2013: Harry Potter, Ten News
2014: Philip Cornford
2015: Ian Heads 
2016: John Smith, The Daily Telegraph
2017: Ita Buttrose
2018: Jana Wendt
2019: Brian Henderson
2020: John Hartigan
2021: John Laws
2022: Bruce McAvaney , of Seven Network

References

External links

Australian journalism awards
2012 establishments in Australia
2014 establishments in Australia